Dil Se.. is a 1998 Indian Hindi-language romantic thriller film written and directed by Mani Ratnam who produced it with Ram Gopal Varma and Shekhar Kapur. Set against the backdrop of Insurgency in Assam, the film stars Shah Rukh Khan and Manisha Koirala, while Preity Zinta makes her film debut in a supporting role. An example of parallel cinema, it is noted as the final installment in Ratnam's trilogy consisting of Roja (1992) and Bombay (1995). The film's soundtrack album, composed by A. R. Rahman, sold six million units in India.

Dil Se.. was screened at the Era New Horizons Film Festival and the Helsinki International Film Festival. Noted for its aspects of nonlinear storytelling, the film was moderately successful at the domestic box office; however, it was a major success overseas, earning $975,000 in the United States and £537,930 in the United Kingdom, becoming the first Indian film to enter the top 10 in the United Kingdom box office charts, and it was also a hit in Japan. 

At the 44th Filmfare Awards, Dil Se.. received 10 nominations, including Best Actress (Koirala) and Best Supporting Actress (Zinta), and won 6 awards, including Best Female Debut (Zinta) and Best Music Director (Rahman). At the 46th National Film Awards, the film won two awards – Best Cinematography and Best Audiography, while also receiving a Netpac Award at the 49th Berlinale.

Plot 
Amarkant Varma (Shah Rukh Khan) is a program executive for All India Radio, dispatched from New Delhi to cover festivities in Assam. On his way there, during a rainy night, Amar is stranded for hours at Haflong railway station to catch the Barak Valley Express. As he waits, he tries to have a smoke and asks a mysterious person for either a match or a lighter. Suddenly a strong gust of wind blows off the person's shawl, revealing a beautiful woman (Manisha Koirala). Amar approaches, tells her she's beautiful, and tries to strike up a conversation. She ignores him. He persists and she eventually asks him for a cup of tea. When he returns with the tea, he watches as she boards the next train with three male passengers and rides off into the distance.

Amar's infatuation with the woman is depicted with a lengthy dance scene, with dozens of dancers dancing on top of a moving train through the beautiful Indian countryside.

Amar reaches his destination and spots the same woman in Silchar. He attempts to talk to her, but she says she cannot recall meeting him before. As part of his news reporting assignment, for the occasion of fifty years of Indian Independence, Amar interviews many Assamese citizens, and an extremist chief, who blames the Indian Government for human rights violations and poverty in the region. The chief states the Liberationists do not wish to enter into any dialogue with the government, and justifies their resistance in Northeast India.

Some time later, Amar describes his encounter with the woman, over the radio, which she hears. He again spots her at a post office. At this juncture, she tells him to leave her alone; but he follows her and tells her that he is in love with her. She resists and tells Amar that she is married.

Amar decides to apologize to her, but she arrives with two men who beat him unconscious.

During the beating, Amar learns that the men are presumably her brothers and that she had lied about her being married. He rejoices in this discovery, despite being badly bruised and bloody. He reaches her home and learns from the locals that she has left. Amar then goes to the post office where he initially spotted her and bribes the PCO owner into giving him her contact details and learns that she is telephoning to Ladakh. Subsequently, Amar travels to Leh, and while recording the Sindhu Darshan Festival, a suicide bomber is chased and shot dead by the Indian military. Amar spots the woman again. As the woman and Amar board a bus, military officers question each passenger before the bus is allowed to leave. Amar tells the officers that he is reporting on the festival, and the woman falsely tells the officers that she is travelling with Amar.

After some travel, the bus breaks down and the passengers are required to walk to a nearby village. En route, the woman reveals her name: Meghna. Amar continues to pursue Meghna, despite her protestations. Meghna tells Amar that her destiny prevents her from being with him. She reveals a traumatic personal history and lets slip that if they were to be together, she would want eight children. Her ambivalence and their mutual attraction is depicted by a daydream dance scene in the desert. The two end up travelling together and recuperate near one another in the desert, over night. In the morning, Amar wakes to find Meghna gone.

Heartbroken, Amar returns to his home in Delhi, where his family introduces him to Preeti Nair (Preity Zinta) from Kerala as a potential bride for him.  Preeti confides that she was recently rejected in love and gets Amar to reveal that he was also just dumped. On their date, Amar spots one of Meghna's associates, Kim, who banished him earlier. Amar chases him down to Connaught Place, where he loses track of the man. Unbeknownst to Amar, the man kills himself with a cyanide pill after being stopped by local police. Because of the extremist nature of the situation, the police relinquish the incident to the CBI.

Back at home, Amar agrees to marry Preeti and wedding preparations promptly begin.

Much to Amar's surprise, Meghna shows up at his engagement party and asks Amar for a place to stay and help getting a job at Amar's All India Radio office, which he does.

Amar continues to pine for Meghna, not knowing she arrived in Delhi as part of a Liberationists group which has planned multiple suicide attacks in New Delhi at the upcoming Delhi Republic Day parade & celebrations. She stays in Amar's residence to escape from the CBI inquiry operation. At one point, Meghna expresses misgivings about her plans to kill innocent civilians. She is scolded by a member of her group and reminded of her duty to their cause.

Based on an eyewitness identification of the Connaught Place incident, Amar is now a prime suspect of the CBI. He is questioned by police and pieces together that Meghna is involved in something dangerous. Amar finds Meghna and questions her motives. She finally reveals to Amar that her name is actually Moina, and as a child, she had been a rape victim of the army. She describes villages being burned to the ground, and family members being raped and murdered. She accuses Amar of having no understanding of her history. She says she seeks justice and liberation through her activities. Amar infers she is planning a suicide attack on the Indian army and the President of India during Republic Day. While trying to grab at a cyanide necklace hanging from her neck, Amar gets arrested for harassing the woman.

In a separate scene, the CBI convinces the Army general of India to grant permission to conduct security checks of all the Army convoys and tankers participating in the parade. An associate of Moina's is privy to the government's secret security plans.

Moina's associates bribe the police officers holding Amar to release him. They follow him out of the police station and assault him again. Amar fights back and renders his attacker unconscious. He then answers a call from Moina, which she had placed to his attacker's mobile phone. Amar pleads with Moina to stop all this and marry him. Moina tearfully says that it is too late and that her fate is sealed. The scene ends with the sounds of bullets, which imply Amar has been shot and killed.

But Amar returns home, beaten and bloody, only to find out from Preeti that Amar's mother is also being questioned and that Moina's location is at Sunder Nagar. Preeti asks if he has any intention of marrying her, and Amar says he's the only one who can stop Moina.

Amar is arrested again and unable to convince the CBI that he is not working with the terrorists. He says he is in love with Moina and that he met her while interviewing an extremist leader. He says he wants to prevent them from perpetrating an attack. The CBI is not convinced. They sedate him for further interrogation later. Through sheer will, Amar is able to resist the sedative effects of the injection he received. He escapes from the CBI and continues his relentless pursuit of Moina.

The next day Moina is prepared for her role in a suicide attack, as an explosive device is concealed under her dress. Amar finds her. He expresses his undying love for her and his desire to be with her. He pleads with her to leave with him, so the two of them can start fresh in a new place. He asks her to say that she loves him. When she does not answer, he persists. Desperate, he asks her to at least let him die with her. He pulls her towards him, and continues to plead with her to say she loves him. She embraces him. As the two embrace one another, they cry, and the bomb carried by Moina explodes, killing them both.

Cast 

 Shah Rukh Khan as Amarkant "Amar" Varma
 Manisha Koirala as Meghna/Moina
 Preity Zinta as Preeti Nair
 Mita Vasisht as Mita
 Arundhati Rao as Kanval Dev Burman – AIR station director
 Raghubir Yadav as Shukla ji – AIR manager
 Zohra Sehgal as Amar's Grandmother
 Janagaraj as Taxi Driver
 Gautam Bora as terrorist Leader
 Sabyasachi Chakrabarty as a terrorist
 Aditya Srivastava as Terrorist
 Sanjay Mishra as a terrorist
 Anupam Shyam as a terrorist
 Shabbir Masani as a terrorist
 Krisn Kant as Kim terrorist
 Manjit Bawa as a terrorist
 Vineeta Malik as Amar's mother
 Piyush Mishra as Arun Kashyap (CBI investigation officer)
 Gajraj Rao as CBI investigation officer
 Priya Parulekar as Young Moina
 Malaika Arora in a special appearance in the song "Chaiyya Chaiyya"
 Vanitha Malik as a school teacher
 Tigmanshu Dhulia as a cameo appearance as man at the post office
 Sameer Chanda as cameo appearance Tuba music shop dealer
 Shaad Ali as a cameo as a citizen of Silchar
 Wasiq Khan as a cameo
 Pia Benegal as a cameo
 Chintu Mohapatra as a cameo
 Karan Nath as a cameo
 Hemant Mishra as cameo
 B. M. Shah as a cameo
 R. K. Nair as Preeti's father
 Alka as Preeti's Mother
 Rajiv Gupta as Sub-inspector
 Avtar Sahani as Army general
 Lakshmi Rattan as Hazarika army official
Sheeba Chaddha as Moina's sister
 Suhail Nayyar as a child artist
 Jessica as a child artist
 Ishitha as a child artist
 Subhadeep Sanyal as a child artist

Production 
Filming began in November 1997, while Shah Rukh Khan was also simultaneously shooting for Karan Johar's Kuch Kuch Hota Hai. Mani Ratnam had initially cast Kajol in the lead female role, though Manisha Koirala later replaced her. Likewise, Simran was cast in a secondary lead role and opted out of other projects to accommodate the film. She later turned down the film citing that the role was too small and would affect her work in the Tamil and Telugu cinema industries. Preity Zinta was later brought in to replace her.

Sameer Chanda, and Wasiq Khan were the production and art designers for Dil Se. The principal photography took place in Himachal Pradesh, Leh, Assam, New Delhi, Kerala, and Ladakh over a period of 55 days. Tigmanshu Dhulia was the casting director. Pia Benegal and Manish Malhotra were the costume designers. The song "Chaiyya Chaiyya" was shot between Malaika Arora and Shah Rukh Khan on top of the Nilgiri Express, en route Ooty, Coonoor and Kotagiri, the train is particularly painted in brown for the song sequence. The travelling scenes, other crucial scenes were shot between Manisha Koirala and Shah Rukh Khan near Alchi Monastery, during the Sindhu Darshan Festival in Leh. The longest song of the film "Satrangi Re" with the lead pair was shot near Thikse Monastery, the mystical Basgo Monastery ruins, and Pangong lake near Pangong Tso in Ladakh. The song "Jiya Jale" was shot between Preity Zinta and Shah Rukh Khan near Athirappilly Falls, Alappuzha backwaters, Periyar National Park, Villangan Hills and Periyar Lake in Kerala. Several action sequences in the film choreographed by Allan Amin were shot near Connaught Place, New Delhi, Rajpath and Old Delhi.

Themes 
Dil Se is said to be a journey through the seven shades of love that are defined in ancient Arabic literature. Those shades are defined as attraction, infatuation, love, reverence, worship, obsession, and death. The character played by Shahrukh Khan passes through each shade during the course of the film. Authors Sangita Gopal and Sujata Moorti of Global Bollywood: Travels of Hindi Song and Dance also compared Khan's romance in the film to the trajectory of love in ancient Arabic literature, believing the lyrics in two of the songs to have delivered an "apocalyptic fatalism".

The film is a dramatization of the attraction between a character from the heart of India and another from a peripheral state and a representation of opposites in the eyes of the law and society. Dil Se is described as a film "structured through deferment and unfulfilled teasing promises". Rediff.com said about the film, "The entire feel of the film is appropriately poetic, with a few romantic exchanges standing out quite memorable. Tigmanshu Dhulia has handled the film's dialogues adroitly. Amid moonlit desert dunes, there is a particularly stirring conversation between the leading pair. Amar reveals his hate for Meghna's eyes – because he can't see the world is hidden behind them and his love for the same, stunning eyes – because he can't see the world hidden behind them."

Elleke Boehmer and Stephen Morton in their book Terror and the Postcolonial (2009) believe that the songs and their exotic locations in the film were very important in masking the impossible reconciliation between a terrorist and an uptight government agent by evoking pure fantasy. They argue that this is a phenomenon called the "liminal space of dreaming" in that the terrorist woman cannot fulfill her sexual desire so the songs fill the void of this desire by "their sumptuousness and exotic locales" in the Ladakh region. The theme of the movie was reported to be paying homage to the 1981 British film The French Lieutenant's Woman.

Release 
Dil Se released on 21 August 1998. Though the film was shot mainly in Hindi-language, director Mani Ratnam also dubbed and released the film in Tamil and Malayalam in the title Uyire.. which became very popular among Tamil-audience with its songs and in Telugu with the title Prematho. Shah Rukh Khan's Tamil dialogues were dubbed by Arvind Swamy in the film.

Reception

Critical reception and box office 

Though Dil Se received an average box office response in India, it found success overseas. It was screened at the Era New Horizons Film Festival and the Helsinki International Film Festival. The film went on to win the Netpac Award at the Berlin International Film Festival, two National Film Awards, and six Filmfare Awards. The intense political agenda of the film with the trials of the Assamese on the India-China border, the love story and the fact that it coincided with the 50th Independence Anniversary celebrations became a major factor for its success overseas, particularly amongst the South Asian diaspora in the west.

The film became the first Indian film to enter the top 10 in the United Kingdom box office charts. Even months after its release in September 1998, the film was still screened on five screens, five times per day with an average of 3,000 spectators across all screens in the Cineworld complex in Feltham, West London. Deepa Deosthalee wrote a positive review to the film, calling it "a picture-perfect ode to love" and praising the direction, writing and performances. Khalid Mohamed found the film disappointing, noting it "fine performances, technique and music" but panning its lack "of that crucial element called a story". Anupama Chopra of India Today wrote, "Amid the reels of tripe churned out by Bollywood every week, Dil Se... is a noble attempt. But coming from Mani, that's simply not good enough." The film was included in Time's "Best of Bollywood" list in 2010. Dil Se was also a hit in Japan.

Awards and nominations

Soundtrack 

The soundtrack features six songs composed by A. R. Rahman. Raja Sen of Rediff called it, "Rahman's finest soundtrack, by far." The soundtrack album sold six million units in India. The song "Chaiyya Chaiyya", based on Sufi music (lyrics based on the Sufi folk song, "Thaiyya Thaiyya" by Bulleh Shah) and Urdu poetry, became especially popular and the song has been featured in the film Inside Man (2006), in the musical Bombay Dreams, and in the television shows Smith and CSI: Miami. The soundtrack was recorded in several other languages.

Malayalam lines for the song "Jiya Jale" was written by Malayalam lyricist Gireesh Puthenchery.

Pink Floyd bass guitarist Guy Pratt for post-Roger Waters albums Delicate Sound of Thunder, The Division Bell and Pulse played bass on title song "Dil Se Re".

Original Version 

Hindi (Dil Se..)

Dubbed Versions

Tamil (Uyire)

Telugu (Premato)

Background Score

Hindi (Dil Se..)
Track List :

Tamil (Uyire)
Track List :

Malayalam (Uyire)
Track List :

Telugu (Premato)
Track List :

References

Bibliography

External links 
 

1998 films
Indian war drama films
Films about terrorism in India
Films directed by Mani Ratnam
Indian films about revenge
Indian Army in films
Films scored by A. R. Rahman
Films set in Delhi
Films shot in Assam
Films shot in Bhutan
Films shot in Delhi
Films shot in Jammu and Kashmir
Films shot in Ooty
Films shot in Thrissur
Films shot in Chalakudy
Films shot in Alappuzha
Films shot in Munnar
Films shot in Idukki
Insurgency in Northeast India
Films whose cinematographer won the Best Cinematography National Film Award
1990s Hindi-language films
1990s romantic thriller films
War romance films
Indian romantic thriller films
Journalism adapted into films
Indian nonlinear narrative films
Films that won the Best Audiography National Film Award
Films about insurgency in Northeast India
1990s war drama films